Symbols of Failure is the third album by Psycroptic. It was released on February 13, 2006 by Neurotic Records. It is the first album to feature Jason Peppiatt on vocals, after he replaced former vocalist Matthew Chalk in 2005.

Track listing

Personnel
 Jason Peppiatt - Vocals
 Joe Haley - Guitar, mixing, production
 Cameron Grant - Bass
 Dave Haley - Drums
 Par Olofsson - Artwork

References

2006 albums
Psycroptic albums
Albums with cover art by Pär Olofsson